This is a list of Slovene writers and poets in Hungary.

A
 Imre Augustich

B

 József Bagáry
 Mária Bajzek Lukács
 Mihály Bakos
 István Ballér
 Irén Barbér
 Mihály Barla
 Iván Bassa
 József Bassa
 Balázs Berke
 Ferenc Berke
 Mihály Bertalanits
 József Borovnják

C
 György Czipott
 Rudolf Czipott

D
 Alajos Drávecz
 József Dravecz

F
 Ádám Farkas
 Iván Fliszár
 János Fliszár

G
 Mihály Gáber
 Alajos Gáspár
 Mátyás Godina

H
 Károly Holecz
 András Horváth
 Ferenc Hüll

K
 János Kardos
 József Klekl (politician)
 József Klekl (writer)
 Péter Kollár
 Mihály Kolossa
 József Konkolics
 József Kossics
 György Kousz
 László Kovács
 Miklós Kovács
 István Kováts
 István Kozel
 Károly Krajczár
 Mátyás Krajczár
 István Kühár (I)
 István Küzmics
 Miklós Küzmics

L
 Miklós Legén
 Gergely Luthár
 Mihály Luttár
 Miklós Luttár
 Pál Luthár
 István Lülik

M
 Miska Magyarics
 Ferenc Marics
 Ferenc Merkli
 Dusán Mukics
 János Murkovics

N
 Dávid Novák
 Ferenc Novák

O
 Ferenc Oslay

P
 István Pauli
 Ágoston Pável
 Irén Pavlics
 Iván Persa
 István Pintér
 József Pusztai

R
 András Rogan
 Cantor-teacher Ruzsics

S
 Ferenc Sbüll
 Antal Stevanecz
 József Szakovics
 Jakab Szabár
 István Szelmár
 István Szijjártó
 János Szlepecz
 István Szmodis
 József Szmodis
 László Szobothin

T
 Ferenc Talányi
 Ferenc Temlin
 János Terbócs
 Sándor Terplán
 Vilmos Tkálecz (Vilmos Tarcsay)

V
 Mihály Szever Vanecsai

Z 
 Terézia Zakoucs
 István Zsemlics
 János Zsupánek
 Mihály Zsupánek

References 
 Anton Trstenjak: Slovenci na Ogrskem, Narodnapisna in književna črtica, OBJAVA ARHIVSKIH VIROV MARIBOR 2006. 
 M. Kozár Mária: A magyarországi szlovének néprajzi szótára, Monošter-Szombathely 1996. 
 Francek Mukič – Marija Kozar: Slovensko Porabje, Mohorjeva Družba, Celje 1982.
 Változó Világ: Mukics Mária: A magyarországi szlovének, Press Publica 2004. 
 Vilko Novak: Martjanska pesmarica, Založba ZRC. Ljubljana 1997. 
 Pokrajinski muzej Murska Sobota, Katalog stalne razstave, Murska Sobota 1997. 
 Ivan Škafar: Bibliografija prekmurskih tiskov od 1715 do 1919, Ljubljana 1978.
 Franc Kuzmič: Bibliografija prekmurskih tiskov 1920–1998, Založba ZRC. Ljubljana 1999.

 Writers and poets
 Writers and poets
 
Slovenian writers, and poets
Slovenian writers
Slovenian writers and poets
Hungary–Slovenia relations